Launcelot Robert Pearson (1 January 1937 – 20 July 2019) was a New Zealand cricketer and basketballer. 

Pearson played 31 first-class matches for Otago between 1961 and 1971. An opening batsman, his highest score was 140 in Otago's victory over Auckland in 1969–70.

He was prominent in basketball in Otago for most of his life as a player, coach and administrator. He captained Otago to the national titles in 1968 and 1970. He was made a life member of Basketball Otago in 2019.

See also
 List of Otago representative cricketers

References

1937 births
2019 deaths
New Zealand cricketers
New Zealand men's basketball players
Otago cricketers
Cricketers from Dunedin
New Zealand basketball coaches